Wankhade or Wankhede may refer to a Maratha kunbi caste :

 Apoorv Wankhade (born 1992), cricketer for Mumbai Indians and Vidarbha Cricket Association
 S. K. Wankhede (1914–1988), cricket administrator and politician
 Subhash Bapurao Wankhede (born 1963), Indian politician,  member of the Shiv Sena political party

Other uses
 Wankhede Stadium, a cricket stadium in the Indian city of Mumbai
 Wankhed, a village in Maharashtra